is a former professional tennis player from Japan.

On 28 May 2018, she reached her highest WTA singles ranking of 187. On 9 September 2019, she peaked at No. 251 in the doubles rankings.

Imanishi made her WTA Tour main-draw debut at the 2014 Japan Women's Open, in the singles event.

Grand Slam singles performance timeline

ITF Circuit finals

Singles: 7 (6 titles, 1 runner-up)

Doubles: 12 (6 titles, 6 runner–ups)

External links
 
 
 Official website

1992 births
Living people
Japanese female tennis players
Sportspeople from Kyoto
21st-century Japanese women